South Elmsall railway station serves the town of South Elmsall in West Yorkshire, England.

Facilities
The station is unstaffed and has had its main buildings (formerly located on the northbound platform) and goods shed demolished.  There are waiting shelters on both platforms and there is a self-service ticket machine provided for passengers to buy tickets prior to travelling or collect pre-paid tickets.  Digital CIS displays, timetable posters and automatic announcements provide train running information.  Step-free access to both platforms is via ramps from the road bridge at the north end.

Services
Mondays to Saturdays there is an hourly service to Leeds via Wakefield Westgate and to Doncaster with a few additional trains in the weekday peaks. On Sundays there is also an hourly service in both directions in the winter 2019 timetable.

There is also a freight-only line to the South Humberside Main Line to Hatfield and Stainforth and beyond (part of the original West Riding and Grimsby Railway) which diverges to the south of the station.

Tickets

The station is in West Yorkshire but South Yorkshire Passenger Transport Executive tickets are valid to and from this station, on services into South Yorkshire.

The station is featured in the literary works of A. F. Bransdreth who set the final scene of Dim the Lights on the southbound platform.

References

External links

Railway stations in Wakefield
DfT Category F1 stations
Former West Riding and Grimsby Railway stations
Railway stations in Great Britain opened in 1866
Northern franchise railway stations
1866 establishments in England